Cássio Gabus Mendes (born 29 August 1961) is a Brazilian actor.

Career 

Debuted on TV in the telenovela Elas por Elas, in 1982, and participated in the telenovelas Ti Ti Ti, Vale Tudo, Tieta and A Indomada, and others. He acted in the miniseries Anos Rebeldes, Mulher and O Quinto dos Infernos.

In cinema, he acted in Boleiros – Era Uma Vez o Futebol (1998) and Boleiros 2 – Vencedores e Vencidos (2006), both by Ugo Giorgetti. He was also cast in Orfeu (1999) by Carlos Diegues, Como Fazer um Filme de Amor (2004) by José Roberto Torero, and Trair e Coçar é Só Começar (2006) by Moacyr Góes, Baptism of Blood (2007) and Caixa Dois (2007).

Also in 2007, he participated in the miniseries Amazônia, de Galvez a Chico Mendes, portraying Chico Mendes, in the telenovela Desejo Proibido and in the special TV show Os Amadores.

In late 2008, seven months after the end of Desejo Proibido, he returned to TV in the telenovela Três Irmãs.

In 2009, the actor is also in theaters with the release of the film Se Eu Fosse Você 2, and participates in the TV show Norma with Denise Fraga.

In 2010, he participates in the TV series S.O.S. Emergência and As Cariocas, both on Rede Globo and in the film Chico Xavier.

In 2011, the actor was in the telenovela Insensato Coração, and in the movies Bruna Surfistinha and Federal Bank Heist.

In 2012, in the miniseries Dercy de Verdade, he portrays Valdemar, one of Dercy Gonçalves's affairs. He was also in the telenovela Lado a Lado.

Between 2013 and 2014, he was in the telenovela Além do Horizonte. In 2014, he is invited by Gilberto Braga to join the cast of Babilônia, portraying the contractor Evandro.

Personal life 
He is son of screenwriter, director, producer, sound designer, stage manager and author of telenovelas Cassiano Gabus Mendes. He is brother of actor Tato Gabus Mendes and married to former actress Lídia Brondi since 1990.

Filmography

Television

Films 
 1998 – Boleiros – Era uma Vez o Futebol .... Zé Américo
 1999 – Orfeu .... Pedro
 2004 – Como Fazer um Filme de Amor .... Alan
 2006 – Boleiros 2 – Vencedores e Vencidos .... Zé Américo
 2006 – Trair e Coçar É Só Começar .... Eduardo
 2007 – Baptism of Blood .... Delegado Fleury
 2007 – Caixa Dois .... Romeiro
 2009 – Se eu Fosse Você 2 .... Nelsinho
 2009 – Cabeça a Prêmio
 2010 – Chico Xavier .... Priest Julio Maria
 2011 – Bruna Surfistinha .... Huldson
 2011 – Assalto ao Banco Central .... Martinho
 2014 – Confissões de Adolescente .... Paulo
 2017 – Gosto Se Discute .... Augusto

References

External links 

1961 births
Living people
Male actors from São Paulo
Brazilian male television actors
Brazilian male telenovela actors
Brazilian male film actors
Brazilian male stage actors